Nevada was a Portuguese duo in the 1980s, active between 1987 and 1991.

Jorge Mendes and Alfredo Azinheira represented Portugal in the Eurovision Song Contest 1987 with the song Neste barco à vela and they finished 18th. Portuguese guitars were played by Zé Braga and Mário Pacheco and backing vocalists were Fernanda Lopes and Isabel Cabral Neves.

After the contest Jorge Mendes left the group and they released an album.

External links
 https://web.archive.org/web/20160303204618/http://anos80.no.sapo.pt/nevada.htm

Eurovision Song Contest entrants for Portugal
Eurovision Song Contest entrants of 1987